Minolia midwayensis is a species of sea snail, a marine gastropod mollusk, in the family Solariellidae.

Distribution
This species occurs in the following locations:
 Bonin
 Midway Atoll

References

Solariellidae